The Remolino-El Charco Fault is a dextral strike-slip fault in the department of Nariño in Colombia.

Etymology 
The fault is named after Remolino Grande and El Charco, Nariño.

Description 
The Remolino-El Charco Fault extends through the Pacific coastal lowlands and plains of Colombia to the east of the city of Tumaco. The fault begins in the southwesternmost point of Colombia and runs towards Guapi. It is close to and parallels the coast. It displaces alluvial fan sediments of the Patía, Mira, and Telembí Rivers and some Pleistocene marine terraces. The fault appears to be a southern continuation of the Naya-Micay Fault. The fault has a very well defined fault line on aerial
photographs and satellite images. Pattern of deflection of streams suggests west side of fault is up.

See also 

 List of earthquakes in Colombia
 Romeral Fault System
 Malpelo Plate

References

Bibliography

Maps 
 

Seismic faults of Colombia
Strike-slip faults
Inactive faults
Faults